The 2007 ADAC Zurich 24 Hours of Nürburgring was the 35th running of the 24 Hours of Nürburgring. It took place on June 10, 2007. Manthey Racing's #1 Porsche claimed honours in the SP7 class and was the overall victor, completing 112 laps over the 24 hours. Zakspeed Racing and their #3 Dodge Viper claimed second overall and finished as top runner in the SP8 GT3 class.

Race results
Class winners in bold.

Unknown if raced

References

Nurburgring
Nürburgring 24 Hours